Prefoldin subunit 2 is a protein that in humans is encoded by the PFDN2 gene.

This gene encodes a member of the prefoldin beta subunit family. The encoded protein is one of six subunits of prefoldin, a molecular chaperone complex that binds and stabilizes newly synthesized polypeptides, thereby allowing them to fold correctly. The complex, consisting of two alpha and four beta subunits, forms a double beta barrel assembly with six protruding coiled-coils.

References

Further reading